Moyra Davey (born 1958) is an artist based in New York City. Davey works across photography, video, and writing.

Early life
Moyra Davey was born in 1958 in Toronto, Ontario, Canada. She grew up in Montreal, where she studied photography and received a BFA from Concordia University in 1982. She then achieved an MFA from the University of California, San Diego in 1988. In 1989, she attended The Whitney Museum of American Art Independent Study Program.

Career
Since the late 1970s, Davey has built a body of work composed of photographs, writings, and video. She was previously a faculty member at the Bard College International Center of Photography Program.

Davey is represented by greengrassi, London and Galerie Buchholz, Cologne/Berlin/New York.

Solo exhibitions

1985 – Agnes Etherington Art Centre, Kingston, Ontario
1994 – Moyra Davey, Peter Doig, Gavin Brown's Enterprise, New York; American Fine Arts, Co., New York
2006 – Monologues (with Julia Scher), Wexner Center for the Arts, Columbus, Ohio
2008 – Long Life Cool White, The Fogg Art Museum, Harvard Art Museums, Harvard University, Cambridge, Massachusetts
2009 – My Necropolis, Arch II Gallery, University of Manitoba, Winnipeg
2010 – Speaker Receiver, Kunsthalle Basel, Basel, Switzerland
2013 – Ornament and Reproach, Presentation House Gallery, Vancouver
2013 – Hangmen of England, Tate Liverpool, Liverpool, UK
2014 – Burn the Diaries, Mumok, Vienna; Camden Arts Centre, London
2017 – Empties, Galerie Buchholz, Cologne
2017 – Portrait / Landscape, Galerie Buchholz, Berlin
2017 – Hell Notes, Portikus, Frankfurt
2018 – Hell Notes, Bielefeld
2018 – "1943", Galerie Buchholz, New York
2018 – Bring My Garters/Do Nothing, experimenter, Kolkata
2019 – Scotiabank Photography Award: Moyra Davey, Ryerson Image Centre, Toronto
2019 – Les Goddesses, Art Institute of Chicago
2019 – i confess, greengrassi, London
2020 – Moyra Davey Peter Hujar, Galerie Buchholz, Berlin (with Peter Hujar)
2020 – The Faithful, National Gallery of Canada, Ottawa
2020 – Lanak/Obras/Works, Artium Museum, Vitoria-Gasteiz, Spain
2022 – Film series, Museum of Modern Art, New York

Awards
2004 – Anonymous Was A Woman Award
2010 – The Louis Comfort Tiffany Foundation Award
2018 – Scotiabank Photography Award
2020 – John Simon Guggenheim Memorial Foundation Fellowship
2022 – Governor General's Awards in Visual and Media Arts

Collections
Davey's work is held in the following permanent collections:
Mildred Lane Kemper Art Museum, St. Louis, Missouri;
Museum of Modern Art, New York
Tate, London
Metropolitan Museum of Art, New York
Art Institute of Chicago, the Whitney Museum of American Art, New York
Solomon R. Guggenheim Museum, New York
San Francisco Museum of Modern Art,
Museum of Contemporary Art, Los Angeles
National Gallery of Art, Washington, DC
National Gallery of Canada, Ottawa
Art Gallery of Ontario, Toronto

Publications
Mother Reader: Essential Writings on Motherhood. Edited by Moyra Davey (New York: Seven Stories, 2001). 
The Problem of Reading (Los Angeles: Documents Books, 2003). 
Long Life Cool White: Photographs and Essays by Moyra Davey (Cambridge, MA: Harvard University Art Museums; New Haven: Yale University Press, 2008). Introduction by Helen Molesworth. 
Copperheads (Toronto: Byewater Bros. Editions, 2010). 
Speaker Receiver (Berlin: Sternberg, 2010). Essays by George Baker, Bill Horrigan, Chris Kraus, and Eric Rosenberg, and an interview by Adam Szymczyk. .
The Wet and the Dry (Paris: Paraguayress, 2011). Edited by castillo/corrales and Will Holder. 
Empties (Vancouver: Presentation House, 2013).
Burn the Diaries (Brooklyn: Dancing Foxes, 2014). 
I'm Your Fan (London: Camden Arts Centre, 2014).
 Les Goddesses / Hemlock Forest (Brooklyn: Dancing Foxes, 2017). Introduction by Aveek Sen. 
Gold Dumps and Ant Hills (Berlin: Toupée, 2017). 
 Index Cards: Selected Essays (New Directions, 2020). Edited by Nicolas Linnert. 
I Confess (Ottawa/Brooklyn: National Gallery of Canada and Dancing Foxes, 2020). Essays by Dalie Giroux and Andrea Kunard.

References

External links
 

1958 births
Living people
20th-century Canadian women artists
21st-century Canadian women artists
Artists from Toronto
Bard College faculty
Concordia University alumni
University of California, San Diego alumni
Governor General's Award in Visual and Media Arts winners